Daniel Richard Cole (born 9 May 1987) is an English professional rugby union player who plays as a prop for Leicester Tigers in Premiership Rugby. Between 2010 and 2023, he has played 100 times for  internationally, and was capped three times for the British & Irish Lions. Cole is known for his scrummaging ability. His former coach at Leicester, Richard Cockerill, described him as one of the finest tighthead props in world rugby.

Club career
Cole's first team début came in the October 2007 EDF Energy Cup pool match against Bath. Most of the 2007–08 season was spent on loan to Bedford Blues and it was the beginning of the 2008–09 season before Cole played for the first team again. Cole was involved in most of the games in the first half of the season. In January 2009, Cole was loaned to Nottingham R.F.C. and subsequently returned to Leicester later in the season to feature as a replacement as Tigers beat London Irish by a single point in the final of the 2008–09 Premiership.

Through injury to Leicester tight-heads Julian White and Martin Castrogiovanni, Cole achieved a run of games during the 2009–10 season which saw him gain notoriety as man-of-the-match against Wasps. In February 2010, Cole signed a new contract. The Tigers went on to retain their league title winning the 2009–10 Premiership final 33–27 against Saracens, where Cole again came on as a replacement for Castrogiovanni. In 2013 Cole won his third Premiership title on this occasion starting in the victory over local rivals Northampton Saints.

Cole won the Outstanding Service Award at the end of the 2016/17 season. 

Cole started the 2022 Premiership Rugby final as Tigers beat Saracens 15-12, with Cole winning his fourth title. On 17 December 2022 Cole made his 300th appearance for Leicester, only the 36th player to achieve the feat, in a 23-16 win against Clermont Auvergne.

International career

England
Cole was a member of the squad that finished third at the 2006 Under 19 Rugby World Championship and the following year represented the England under-20 team in the Six Nations Under 20s Championship. In January 2009 he made his debut for the England Saxons against  and later that year started all three games at the 2009 Churchill Cup, including the final against Ireland A.

He played in all subsequent games in the 2010 Six Nations, earning his first start against Italy and scoring his first international try in what was also his first home start against , and began to cement his place as England's first-choice tighthead.

Cole was taken on the 2010 summer tour of Australia and played in both matches. Although England lost the first game, Cole put in a strong performance which saw the England scrum gain an unprecedented two penalty tries. The second Test saw England beat Australia 20–21. He was a member of the side that won the 2011 Six Nations Championship missing out on a grand slam with defeat in the final round against Ireland. He was included in the squad for the 2011 Rugby World Cup and started in their quarter-final elimination against France.

Cole won his fiftieth cap in the final round of the 2015 Six Nations Championship against France as England finished runners up in the tournament. He was included in Stuart Lancaster's 31-man squad for the 2015 Rugby World Cup and went on to start in all four of their pool games as the hosts failed to reach the knock out phase. 

Cole was included in new coach Eddie Jones's 31-man squad for the 2016 Six Nations and scored a try in the final game against France as England completed the grand slam. Cole was included in the 2016 tour of Australia; he played in the one-off test against Wales at Twickenham, which also saw a debut for Leicester teammate Ellis Genge, and started in all three tests in Australia. Cole scored a try in the final test of the series in which England whitewashed the Wallabies for the first time. The following year saw Cole score a try against Italy during the 2017 Six Nations Championship as the team eventually retained their title missing out on a consecutive grand slam with defeat in the final game away to Ireland which also brought an end to a record equalling eighteen successive Test victories.

Although Cole was dropped from England's international team at the end of 2018, a resurgence in form saw him re-selected for the 2019 Six Nations Championship. Cole's continued good form saw him chosen for the 2019 Rugby World Cup, for what would be his third Rugby World Cup. On 26 September 2019, in a World Cup pool match against the United States, Cole became England's joint-third highest capped player with 91 international appearances. In the World Cup final starter Kyle Sinckler was knocked unconscious after two minutes and replaced by Cole for the remainder of the game as England were defeated by South Africa to finish runners up.

British and Irish Lions
Cole was one of 37 players selected to represent the Lions on their 2013 British & Irish Lions tour to Australia and featured in all three Tests as the Lions won their first series for sixteen years.

In 2017 Cole was selected for the British & Irish Lions tour to New Zealand, he did not make the test team but featured in five non-capped tour games. Overall he played fourteen times for the Lions on the 2013 and 2017 tours winning three caps.

International tries

Honours
England
 Six Nations Championship: 2011, 2016, 2017
 Rugby World Cup runner-up: 2019

Leicester Tigers
 Premiership: 2008-09, 2009-10, 2012-13, 2021-22
 Premiership runner up: 2010-11, 2011-12
 EPCR Challenge Cup runner up: 2020-21

References

External links
 
Leicester Tigers profile
England profile

1987 births
Living people
Bedford Blues players
British & Irish Lions rugby union players from England
England international rugby union players
English rugby union players
Leicester Tigers players
Rugby union players from Leicester
Rugby union props